Love Finds a Home is a 2009 made-for-television Christian drama film, the eighth and final installment based on a series of books by Janette Oke. It aired on Hallmark Channel on September 5, 2009. The film is based on the book Love Finds a Home by Janette Oke. Sarah Jones, Haylie Duff, and Jordan Bridges reprise their roles from Love Takes Wing.

The film is the eighth in the Love Comes Softly series of television movies on Hallmark Channel that includes Love Comes Softly (2003), Love's Enduring Promise (2004), Love's Long Journey (2005), Love's Abiding Joy (2006), Love's Unending Legacy (2007), Love's Unfolding Dream (2007), and Love Takes Wing (2009), as well as two 2011 prequels; Love Begins and Love's Everlasting Courage, which are not based on any novels.

Plot
A  pregnant Dr. Annie Watson (Haylie Duff) is going to stay with her best friend, Dr. Belinda Owens (Sarah Jones) while her husband Peter is off on a surveying job. Annie's mother-in-law Mary (Patty Duke), a seen-it-all midwife whose homeopathic remedies and folksy wisdom are at odds with Belinda’s scientific knowledge, comes along. Belinda has a patient, Mabel McQueen, with postnatal anaemia which she succeeds to treat after a few ups and downs despite her tough husband who rejects the tonic. As Belinda deals with the headaches Mary is causing, she must also address issues at home. While her adopted daughter Lillian (Courtney Halverson) discovers the joys and pains of first love, Belinda and her husband Lee (Jordan Bridges) find their own relationship suffering over Belinda’s inability to get pregnant. Just as the town learned to put its faith in Belinda as their doctor, Belinda must learn to accept that the best guidance for her own problems may come from unlikely sources. Annie gives birth to a daughter, Melinda (Lindy), and the movie ends with Mary hopping into a buggy to leave and Belinda whispering something in her ear. When her husband asks what she said, the answer is: "Oh, I just told her that I'll need a midwife soon."

Cast

 Sarah Jones as Dr. Belinda Owens
 Patty Duke as Mary Watson
 Jordan Bridges as Lee Owens
 Haylie Duff as Dr. Annie Watson
 Courtney Halverson as Lillian Owens
 Michael Trevino as Joshua Coil
Jeffrey Muller as Peter Watson

Differences From The Novel
 Lee and Lillian are not from the novel, as are many other characters and situations. Belinda is still unmarried in this novel, and marries Drew Simpson at the close of the novel.
 Missie and Marty, the original female leads from the earlier novel series, are also present in the novel whereas they are absent in this adaptation.

Anachronisms
 The pennies Mrs. McQueen gave to Lillian at Belinda's office have an image of the Lincoln Memorial on them. The Lincoln Memorial did not appear on pennies until 1959.

References

External links
 
 Love Finds a Home at Hallmark Channel
 Love Finds a Home at Hallmark Channel's Press Site

2009 television films
2009 films
Hallmark Channel original films
Films about Christianity
Love Comes Softly (TV film series)
American pregnancy films
Television sequel films
Films directed by David S. Cass Sr.
2000s American films